The 2019–20 Women's Senior T20 Challenger Trophy was the third edition of India's Women's T20 Challenger Trophy. Three teams made up of the best players in India competed in a double round-robin group, with the top two advancing to the final. The three teams competing were renamed from the previous two tournaments: India Blue, Green and Red became India A, B and C, with India C beating India B in the final by 8 wickets to win the tournament. All matches were held at the Barabati Stadium, Cuttack across a week in January 2020.

Competition format
The three teams played in a double round-robin group, playing each other team twice, with the top two advancing to the final. Matches were played using a Twenty20 format.

The group worked on a points system with positions with the group being based on the total points. Points were awarded as follows:

Win: 4 points. 
Tie: 2 points. 
Loss: 0 points.
No Result/Abandoned: 2 points. 

If points in the final table are equal, teams are separated by their Net Run Rate.

Squads

Source: BCCI

Standings

Source: CricketArchive

Group stage

Final

Statistics

Most runs

Source: CricketArchive

Most wickets

Source: CricketArchive

References

2019–20 Indian women's cricket
2019–20
Domestic cricket competitions in 2019–20
Senior Women's T20 Challenger Trophy